Tantasqua Regional High School is located in Fiskdale, Massachusetts. It serves the towns of Brimfield, Brookfield, Holland, Sturbridge, and Wales. The school colors are green and gold and the school song is "Hail, Tantasqua", set to the music of "Men of Harlech."

History
Tantasqua Regional High School was founded in 1953, and an initial addition to the building was approved in 1962. A 1995 plan for renovation was rejected, but a new building was completed in 2002.

Format
Tantasqua is divided into an academic division and a technical division.

Athletics
TRHS athletic teams are nicknamed the Warriors. The baseball team won the 1977 Massachusetts Division 2 state championship, and the boys basketball team won the 2007 Division 2 state championship.

Performing arts
Tantasqua has two competitive show choirs, the mixed-gender "ENCORE!" and the all-female "Radiance". The program also hosts an annual competition.

Notable alumni
Joel Crouse, singer 
JJ Howland - Tampa Bay Buccaneers

References

External links
Tantasqua Regional High School website
The Tantasqsuan

Educational institutions established in 1953
Schools in Worcester County, Massachusetts
Public high schools in Massachusetts
Buildings and structures in Sturbridge, Massachusetts
1953 establishments in Massachusetts